Smith-Williams-Durham Boarding House was a historic boarding house located at Hendersonville, Henderson County, North Carolina. It was built about 1909, and was raised to two-stories and remodeled in 1918.  It was a rambling frame former dwelling with Classical Revival style design elements.  It had a low hipped roof with extended and bracketed eaves and a single tiered wraparound porch.  It has been demolished.

It was listed on the National Register of Historic Places in 1989.

References

Hotel buildings on the National Register of Historic Places in North Carolina
Neoclassical architecture in North Carolina
Hotel buildings completed in 1918
Buildings and structures in Henderson County, North Carolina
National Register of Historic Places in Henderson County, North Carolina
Hendersonville, North Carolina